This is a list of bridges and other crossings of the Thompson River, in the Canadian province of British Columbia from its mouth upstream to its source(s).  Also listed are crossings of the North and South Forks.

Main River

North Thompson River
This is a list of all crossings of the North Thompson River from its mouth in Kamloops to its source.

South Thompson River
This is a list of all crossings of the South Thompson River from its mouth in Kamloops to its source.

See also
List of crossings of the Fraser River
List of crossings of the Nechako River

Thompson
Lists of bridges in Canada
Bridges in Canada by river
Lists of river crossings
Crossings